The Astra, Little Horse, was an English car built by a subsidiary of British Anzani of Hampton Hill, Middlesex from 1954 until 1959. At GBP348 it claimed to be the smallest and cheapest four-wheeler on the British market. The car had originally been built by JARC motors and sold as the Little Horse.

Car
It featured a rear-mounted  air-cooled, twin-cylinder engine mounted under the floor driving the rear wheels through a three-speed motorcycle-type gearbox. The steel channel section chassis had all-round independent suspension with swing axles at the rear.  Most cars had two seater estate car bodies, but some four-seat saloons were also made.  The bodies were made of aluminium. The car could also be bought in kit form. It was claimed to be able to reach  and return .

After production ceased, some coupés were made by Gill cars and sold as the Getabout. The rights were also bought by Harold Lightburn of Camden, Adelaide, Australia who fitted a new glass-fibre estate body and sold the car as the Zeta between 1963 and 1966.

See also
 List of car manufacturers of the United Kingdom

References

External links
BritishAnzani.co.uk
Astra automobile history & data
Lightburn Zeta

Microcars
Vehicle manufacture in London
Cars introduced in 1954
Defunct motor vehicle manufacturers of England